Marlene Hagge (née Bauer; born February 16, 1934) is an American former professional golfer. She was one of the thirteen founders of the LPGA in 1950. She won one major championship and 26 LPGA Tour career events. She is a member of the World Golf Hall of Fame.

Amateur career
Hagge was born in Eureka, South Dakota and had a progressively successful amateur experience. She started playing golf at age 3. At age 10, she won the Long Beach City Boys Junior. At age 13, she won the Western and National Junior Championships, the Los Angeles Women's City Championship, the Palm Springs Women's Championship, Northern California Open and the Indio Women's Invitational. In 1947, at age 13, she became the youngest player to make the cut at the U.S. Women's Open and finished eighth. In 1949, at the age of 15, she became the youngest athlete ever to be named Associated Press Athlete of the Year, Golfer of the Year and Teenager of the Year, and she won the U.S. Girls' Junior and the WWGA Junior titles.

Professional career
Hagge was the youngest of the thirteen women who founded the LPGA in 1950, and remains the youngest ever member of the LPGA Tour. Her older sister, Alice Bauer, was also a founder. She won her first tournament in 1952 at the Sarasota Open. She would go on to win a total of 26 events on the LPGA Tour, including one major championships, the 1956 LPGA Championship. That year, she was also the tour's leading money winner and led the tour in wins with eight. In 2002, was voted into the LPGA Tour Hall of Fame through the Veteran's Category in and was officially inducted into the World Golf Hall of Fame. Her final competitive appearance on the LPGA Tour came in 1996.

Hagge appeared on the June 18, 1961 episode of the CBS game show What's My Line.

Personal
She married Bob Hagge, her sister Alice's ex-husband in late 1955. They divorced in 1964.

Hagge was married to former PGA Tour golfer Ernie Vossler from 1995 until his death on February 16, 2013. They lived in La Quinta, California, where she remains.

Professional wins

LPGA Tour wins (26)
1952 (2) Sarasota Open, Bakersfield Open (tied with Betty Jameson, Betsy Rawls and Babe Zaharias)
1954 (1) New Orleans Open
1956 (8) Sea Island Open, Babe Zaharias Open, Pittsburgh Open, Triangle Round Robin, LPGA Championship, World Championship, Denver Open, Clock Open
1957 (2) Babe Zaharias Open, Lawton Open
1958 (2) Lake Worth Open Invitational, Land of Sky Open
1959 (2) Mayfair Open, Hoosier Open
1963 (1) Sight Open
1964 (1) Mickey Wright Invitational
1965 (5) Babe Zaharias Open, Milwaukee Open, Phoenix Thunderbirds Open, LPGA Tall City Open, Alamo Open
1969 (1) Stroh's-WBLY Open
1972 (1) Burdine's Invitational

Major championships

Wins (1)

1 Won on first hole of sudden-death playoff.

See also
List of golfers with most LPGA Tour wins

References

External links

American female golfers
LPGA Tour golfers
Winners of LPGA major golf championships
World Golf Hall of Fame inductees
Golfers from South Dakota
Golfers from California
People from Eureka, South Dakota
Sportspeople from Riverside County, California
People from La Quinta, California
1934 births
Living people
21st-century American women